Diane Watt is a British medievalist, currently Professor of Medieval English Literature at the University of Surrey. She previously held a personal chair at Aberystwyth University, where she was Deputy Director of the Institute of Medieval and Early Modern Studies (IMEMS). She was Charles A. Owen Jr. Distinguished Visiting Professor of Medieval Studies at the University of Connecticut in 2005. She was awarded a Snell Exhibition to study at Balliol College, University of Oxford, and was awarded her DPhil in English Literature in 1993. She is a Fellow of the Learned Society of Wales.

Works 
Watt is the author of three important books on late medieval women's writing: Secretaries of God, Medieval Women's Writing and Women, Writing and Religion. She has also written a study of the work of Chaucer's friend and literary executor John Gower, entitled Amoral Gower which received critical praise in the journal Speculum. She was awarded the John Hurt Fisher Prize for "significant contribution to the field of John Gower Studies" in 2004. She has also published an edition of the letters of the Paston women, and has edited and co-edited a number of other works. The Lesbian Premodern, co-edited with Noreen Giffney and Michelle M. Sauer was nominated for a Lambda Literary Award in the LGBT Anthology category. Watt was awarded a Leverhulme Trust Major Research Fellowship in 2016 for her project "Women's Literary Culture Before the Conquest". Major Research Fellowships are awarded to "enable well-established and distinguished researchers in the humanities and social sciences to devote themselves to a single research project of outstanding originality and significance". From 2015-2017 she led the Leverhulme-funded international research network, "Women's Literary Culture and the Medieval English Canon".

Publications

References

British medievalists
Women medievalists
Academics of the University of Surrey
Academics of Aberystwyth University
University of Connecticut faculty
Living people
British women historians
Year of birth missing (living people)